Don Cristóbal de Guzmán Cecetzin (or Cecepaticatzin) was a colonial Nahua noble from Santa María Cuepopan in San Juan Tenochtitlan. A son of the ruler don Diego Huanitzin, don Cristóbal first served as alcalde in 1556 before becoming Tenochtitlan's next-to-last tlatoani and third governor in 1557, titles he held until his death in 1562.

See also
List of Tenochtitlan rulers

References

|-

|-

1562 deaths
Tenochca tlatoque
Governors of San Juan Tenochtitlan
Alcaldes of San Juan Tenochtitlan
Year of birth unknown